The 2014 Claro Open Cali was a professional tennis tournament played on clay courts. It was the first edition of the tournament which was part of the 2014 ATP Challenger Tour. It took place in Cali, Colombia between 29 September and 4 October 2014.

Singles main-draw entrants

Seeds

 1 Rankings are as of September 22, 2014.

Other entrants
The following players received wildcards into the singles main draw:
  Nicolás Barrientos
  Eduardo Struvay
  David Konstantinov
  José Hernández

The following players received entry from the qualifying draw:
  Marcelo Arévalo
  Darian King
  Wilson Leite
  Marcelo Demoliner

The following player received entry by a special exempt:
  Agustín Velotti

The following players received entry as an alternate:
  Andrés Molteni
  Cristian Garín

Champions

Singles

 Paolo Lorenzi def.  Víctor Estrella Burgos, 4–6, 6–3, 6–3

Doubles

 Guido Andreozzi /  Guillermo Durán def.  Alejandro González /  César Ramírez, 6–3, 6–4

External links
Official Website

Claro Open Cali
Claro Open Cali
2014 in Colombian tennis